In mathematics — specifically, in measure theory — a perfect measure (or, more accurately, a perfect measure space) is one that is "well-behaved" in some sense.  Intuitively, a perfect measure μ is one for which, if we consider the pushforward measure on the real line R, then every measurable set is "μ-approximately a Borel set".  The notion of perfectness is closely related to tightness of measures:  indeed, in metric spaces, tight measures are always perfect.

Definition

A measure space (X, Σ, μ) is said to be perfect if, for every Σ-measurable function f : X → R and every A ⊆ R with f−1(A) ∈ Σ, there exist Borel subsets A1 and A2 of R such that

Results concerning perfect measures

 If X is any metric space and μ is an inner regular (or tight) measure on X, then (X, BX, μ) is a perfect measure space, where BX denotes the Borel σ-algebra on X.

References

 
 
 

Measures (measure theory)